2sunhwan-ro(), Loop 2 or 2nd Sunhwan-ro is the roads in South Korea.
 2sunhwan-ro (Gwangju)
 2sunhwan-ro (Cheongju)